Suillus decipiens is an edible species of mushroom in the family Suillaceae. First described by Charles Horton Peck in 1889 as Boletinus decipiens, it was transferred to Suillus in 1898 by Otto Kuntze. The fungus is found in southeastern North America, with the northern limit of its range extending to New Jersey.

See also
List of North American boletes

References

External links

Edible fungi
Fungi of North America
decipiens
Fungi described in 1889
Taxa named by Charles Horton Peck